Land Between the Lakes National Recreation Area is a United States  national recreation area in Kentucky and Tennessee between Lake Barkley and Kentucky Lake. It was designated as a national recreation area in 1963 by President John F. Kennedy and developed using funds appropriated during the Johnson administration.

Originally managed by the Tennessee Valley Authority, which constructed dams to create the two lakes in this area, the recreation area was later transferred to the administration of the United States Forest Service. In 1991, it was designated a UNESCO Biosphere Reserve. President Donald Trump's administration withdrew it from the program as of June 2017.

Geography
The Tennessee and Cumberland rivers flow very close to each other in the northwestern corner of Middle Tennessee and Western Kentucky, separated by a narrow and mostly low ridge. The area of land that separates the two bodies of water has been known as  "Between the Rivers" since the 1830s or 1840s.

After the Cumberland River was impounded in the 1960s and a canal was constructed between the two manmade lakes, Land Between the Lakes became the largest inland peninsula in the United States. Downstream from this area, the courses of the two rivers: the mouth of the Cumberland empties into the Ohio River approximately 4 mi (7 km) from that of the Tennessee.

History
Communities which existed in the area include Tharpe and Model in Tennessee, and Golden Pond, Kentucky. During the American Civil War, the Confederate government built Fort Henry on the banks of the Tennessee River, in an effort to protect the upper reaches of that river from Union gunboats. Kentucky had declared its neutrality in the war. After Fort Henry fell to Union forces in early 1862, there was little more Civil War action in the area. Other areas were more strategically important, and the Union occupied Tennessee from 1862 to the end of the war.

Tennessee Valley Authority
During the Great Depression, President Franklin D. Roosevelt established the Tennessee Valley Authority as part of his New Deal. Specifically, the Authority was to construct a series of dams for both flood control and generation of electricity throughout the rural Tennessee Valley. The project would provide much needed jobs in the area, as well as provide electricity to a large area that lacked it. With the US entry into World War II, the project was also needed to satisfy electrical demand from the aluminum industry for the war effort. The site of the last dam downstream on the Tennessee River was to be Gilbertsville, Kentucky. The resulting impoundment, completed in the early 1940s, resulted in Kentucky Lake.

Because the project would result in flooding of some of the low-lying land on the western side of the area, the TVA exercised eminent domain, condemning some of the properties and forcing the removal of approximately 800 families from their homes. As a result, entire towns, including Birmingham, Kentucky, were flooded and are now underwater.

Some residents were outraged about these actions, while others were happy to sell their land and start a new life in a less remote area.

The plan called for a new dam and the evacuation of residents from the entire former "Between the Rivers" area, not all of which was to be flooded. The area was to be developed as the Land Between the Lakes National Recreation Area, to produce a multiple-use approach to recreational lands.

The United States Army Corps of Engineers constructed a dam on the Cumberland, producing another lake. It was planned to be at the same elevation as Kentucky Lake, and the two rivers were to be connected by a canal that did not require locks. This project was intended to lessen the shipping distances for goods going from the Cumberland Valley to ports on the Gulf of Mexico, thus increasing their profitability.

The dam on the Cumberland, resulting in Lake Barkley, and a canal were completed in the 1960s. The lake was named after Alben W. Barkley, a Kentucky politician who had served as Vice President under President Harry S. Truman.

Creation of a National Recreation Area

Unlike a national park, there would be areas where hunting would be allowed. Plans for the recreation area included attractions such as a bison range, as this mammal had historically been present on the prairie in this area. In addition, a reconstructed 1850-style farm, called "The Homeplace", was to be operated as a living museum, with on-site staff in period costume simulating life on the farm and using period agricultural techniques. (Both of these attractions were added in the 1970s.)

The road through the Tennessee portion was renamed from State Route 49 to "The Trace." This was short for "Buffalo Trace," as both Native Americans and later European-American settlers followed paths, and later roads, developed from the seasonal migration paths of bison).

This project required the abandonment of the communities of Tharpe and Model in Tennessee, and Golden Pond, Kentucky. The remains of a former iron furnace, manned in the 1850s by enslaved African-American workers, is about all that remains of Model. The former site of Golden Pond is now occupied by the headquarters of the recreation area and retains the postal address for it. Also at this site is a museum, a planetarium, and an environmental education area.

The recreation area has many miles of hiking trails, numerous boat ramps, an off-road vehicle area, and numerous campgrounds, plus group lodges and a few cabins. Most of the attractions require a user fee.

Beginning in the 1970s, the  "Elk & Bison Prairie" enclosure was developed. In preparation, the TVA conducted prescribed burns to encourage the expansion of the remnant patches of native prairie, which had been crowded out by the growth of oak and hickory forests over the previous 150 years, when grazing animals were not held here. After the area was regularly burned and reseeded with grasses, elk (from Elk Island National Park in Alberta, Canada) and American bison were brought to the prairie. Their grazing helps limit the growth of trees.

In 1996 the "Elk & Bison Prairie" was officially inaugurated. It is open to driving tours and visitors can see the large mammals that occupied a typical 18th-century landscape for this area.

In the 1990s, the directors of the TVA decided to withdraw from activities requiring direct taxpayer funding. In 1998, the US Congress authorized transfer of operation of the area to the U.S. Forest Service of the United States Department of Agriculture.

References

Further reading
 Ronald A. Foresta. The Land Between the Lakes: A Geography of the Forgotten Future (University of Tennessee Press; 2013) 308 pages; scholarly study
 A review of Foresta's book, by William E. O'brien.

External links

 
 www.LandBetweenTheLakes.US - U.S. Forest Service official site

Reservoirs in Kentucky
Reservoirs in Tennessee
Protected areas of Lyon County, Kentucky
National Recreation Areas of the United States
Protected areas of Stewart County, Tennessee
Protected areas of Trigg County, Kentucky
Former biosphere reserves of the United States
Protected areas established in 1963
Dover, Tennessee
Landforms of Lyon County, Kentucky
Landforms of Stewart County, Tennessee
Landforms of Trigg County, Kentucky
Bison herds
1963 establishments in Kentucky
1963 establishments in Tennessee